The following is a timeline of the history of the city of Toulon, France.

Prior to 20th century

 5th C. – Catholic diocese of Toulon established.
 1096 – Toulon Cathedral construction begins.
 1259 – Charles of Anjou in power.
 14th C. -  in use.
 1524
 Tour Royale, Toulon (fort) built.
 Tour Royale seized by Charles V, Holy Roman Emperor.
 1543/44 - Ottoman wintering in Toulon offered by Francis I of France.
 1599 – Naval arsenal and shipyard built.
 18th C. - Toulon Cathedral construction completed.
 1707 – Battle of Toulon (1707).
 1720 – Plague.
 1738 –  (gate) built.
 1744 – February: Battle of Toulon fought near city.
 1748 – Bagne of Toulon (prison) begins operating.
 1788 –  built.
 1790 – Toulon becomes part of the Var souveraineté.
 1793 – Siege of Toulon.
 1800 –  founded.
 1801 – Catholic diocese disestablished, per Concordat of 1801.
 1806 – Population: 28,170.
 1833 –  established.
 1841 – Population: 45,449.
 1846 – Population: 62,941.
 1853 – Shipbuilder Société Nouvelle des Forges et Chantiers de la Méditerranée established in nearby La Seyne-sur-Mer.
 1859 – Toulon station opens.
 1873
 République du Var newspaper begins publication.
 Bagne of Toulon (prison) closes.
 1879 –  newspaper begins publication.
 1884 – Cholera epidemic.
 1886
  begins operating.
 Société de géographie de Toulon founded.
 Population: 70,122.
 1888 –  opens.

20th century

1900s–1940s
 1901
 Population: 101,602.
 1908 – Société des sciences naturelles et d'archéologie de Toulon et du Var founded.
 1911 – Population: 104,582.
 1912 – Société des Amis du Vieux Toulon et de sa Région established.
 1920 – Stade Mayol (stadium) opens.
 1935 – August: Violent uprisings by shipyard workers against the government's restrictive austerity policy is resulting in a large number of deaths and injuries.
 1936 – Population: 150,310.
 1940 – 12–13 June:  by Italian forces.
 1942 – 27 November: Scuttling of the French fleet in Toulon.
 1944 – Sporting Toulon Var football club formed.
 1948 – Bazeille apartment building constructed in Port Marchand.
 1949 –  begins operating.

1950s–1990s
 1950 – 12 February: Communist demonstration.
 1957 –  (school) founded.
 1959 – Maurice Arreckx becomes mayor.
 1961 –  opens.
 1964
 A57 autoroute opens.
  created.
 1966 – Toulon–Hyères Airport opens.
 1967 – Toulon Tournament of football begins.
 1968 - University of Toulon founded.
 1973
 August: Racial unrest.
 1975 – Population: 181,801.
 1979 – University of the South, Toulon-Var established.
 1980 – Toulon Book Fair begins.
 1982 – Toulon becomes part of the Provence-Alpes-Côte d'Azur region.
 1986 – March:  held.
 1989 – 15 February:  explosion occurs.
 1990 – Population: 167,619.
 1992 – 16 December:  occurs.
 1995 – Jean-Marie Le Chevallier becomes mayor.
 1997 –  (book fair) begins.

21st century

 2001 – Hubert Falco becomes mayor.
 2002
  opens on the A50 autoroute.
  (school) established.
 2003
 Regional  bus begins operating.
 Mosque established.
 2006 – Palais des Sports de Toulon opens.
 2010 – June: 2010 Var floods occur in vicinity of Toulon.
 2011
  opens.
 Population: 163,974.
 2014 – 23 March:  held.
 2015 – December: 2015 Provence-Alpes-Côte d'Azur regional election held.

See also
 Toulon history
 
 
 
  department
 History of Provence region
 

Other cities in the Provence-Alpes-Côte d'Azur region:
 Timeline of Aix-en-Provence
 
 Timeline of Avignon
 Timeline of Marseille
 Timeline of Nice

References

This article incorporates information from the French Wikipedia.

Bibliography

in English

in French

External links

 Map of Toulon, 1999
 Items related to Toulon, various dates (via Europeana).
 Items related to Toulon, various dates (via Digital Public Library of America).

toulon
Toulon
toulon